Acoustified! is the first solo studio album by American rock musician Deron Miller. Released on December 9, 2013, by Distant Recordings, it features acoustic recordings of songs by Miller's bands CKY, Foreign Objects and Oil, as well as a number of other cover versions. The recording of the album was funded by Indiegogo, and the release was preceded by the single "Dressed in Decay".

Background
Acoustified! was produced by Miller and recorded, engineered, mixed and mastered by Stephen Petree. The recording and production of the album was funded through the crowdfunding website Indiegogo, on which Miller was asking for $8,000 funding. Total funding reached over $13,000 by the end of the campaign, with over 300 backers contributing to the project.

The artwork for Acoustified! was produced by Travis Smith, who had previously produced the artwork for CKY's 2009 studio album Carver City. All of the Indiegogo backers for the album were credited in the liner notes as "executive producers". The album was released digitally on December 9, 2013, with a limited run of 500 copies printed on CD.

Prior to the release of the album, the recording of "Dressed in Decay" was released to Indiegogo backers when the campaign reached $5,000 in donations. It was later released as the only single from the album in June 2013, backed with an instrumental version of the recording. Several songs were also released as exclusive bonus tracks for backers.

Acoustified! was later reissued in September 2014 featuring a number of previously unreleased recordings – CKY's "Behind the Screams", "As the Tables Turn" and "...And She Never Returned", Oil's "Drying Up", and World Under Blood's "Into the Arms of Cruelty".

Track listing

Personnel
Deron Miller – vocals, guitar, bass, production
Stephen Petree – recording, engineering, mixing, mastering
Travis Smith – artwork, design
Phil Bowman – layout
Sam Evans – additional layout

References

2013 debut albums
Deron Miller albums